The Renault AX is an automobile manufactured by Renault. It was produced between 1908 and 1914 and was mostly used by cab drivers.

The AX had a 2-cylinders straight engine with a displacement of 1,060 cc and a power of 8 kW. Its maximum speed was 34 mph (55 km/h). The vehicle weighed 750 kg.

References

AX